Punctum pygmaeum is a species of very small, air-breathing land snail, a terrestrial pulmonate gastropod mollusk in the family Punctidae, the dot snails.

Shell description 

For terms see gastropod shell.
The shell is very small, 1.2-1.6 mm in width.

The 0.6-0.8 x 1.2-1.6 mm shell is almost flat, extremely densely and regularly striated, appearing silky shiny light horny brown. There are 3-3.5 moderately convex whorls, the aperture is rounded, with a thin margin which is not reflected and without a lip. The umbilicus is wide (25% of shell diameter).

Habitat 
These gastropods are commonly found in damp, dim, and undisturbed areas including the margins or wetlands, wet woodland, and leaf-littered forests.  They may also live in mossy suburban gardens. They commonly lay their eggs underneath damp soil or rocks.

Distribution 
This species occurs in countries and islands including:
 Czech Republic
 Great Britain
 Ireland
 Slovakia
 Sweden, Norway, Denmark and Finland
 Poland
 Ukraine
 Netherlands
 Latvia
 Bulgaria
 United States
 and other areas

References

External links
Punctum pygmaeum at Animalbase taxonomy,short description, distribution, biology,status (threats), images 
Punctum pygmaeum   images at Encyclopedia of Life

Punctidae
Gastropods described in 1801